Actinidia chinensis (Planch.), known commercially as the golden kiwifruit, is a fruiting vine, native to China.  It is one of some 40 related species of the genus Actinidia, and closely related to Actinidia deliciosa, which is the source of the most common commercial kiwifruit. Fruit colour may vary from green to lime green or gold, depending on breeding.

Description

Actinidia chinensis has a smooth, bronze skin, with a beak shape at the stem attachment. Flesh colour varies from bright green to a clear, intense yellow. This species is sweeter and more aromatic in flavour compared to A. deliciosa, similar to some subtropical fruits. One of the most attractive varieties has a red 'iris' around the centre of the fruit and yellow flesh outside. The yellow fruit obtains a higher market price and, being less hairy than the fuzzy kiwifruit, is more palatable for consumption without peeling. A commercially viable variety of this red-ringed kiwifruit, patented as EnzaRed, is a cultivar of the Chinese hong yang variety.

'Hort16A' is a golden kiwifruit cultivar marketed worldwide, first as Zespri Gold, then as SunGold. This cultivar suffered significant losses in New Zealand from late 2010 to 2013 due to the PSA bacterium. A new cultivar of golden kiwifruit, 'Zesy002', was found to be more disease-resistant and most growers changed to this cultivar, with its worldwide demand continuing into 2019.

Habitat
In its native habitat Actinidia chinensis grows in thickets, thick (oak) forests (e.g. Quercus aquifolioides, Quercus oxyodon, Quercus lamellosa), and light secondary forests and bushland. In Western gardens it may range  in all directions, making it unsuitable for all but the largest spaces unless pruned back hard at the end of every growing season.

Origin and cultivation
The origin of Actinidia chinensis is from Hubei or Sichuan, China exported to New Zealand in 1904. In China, Actinidia chinensis is dispersed in the entire southeast of the country. It was first grown commercially in New Zealand, where it has been bred commercially as the variety, Actinidia deliciosa.

Herbarium specimens, but not plants, were forwarded to the Royal Horticultural Society by the British plant hunter Robert Fortune, from which Jules Émile Planchon named the new genus in the London Journal of Botany, 1847. Charles Maries, collecting for Messrs Veitch noted it in Japan, but the introduction to Western horticulture was from E.H. Wilson, who sent seeds collected in Hupeh to Veitch in 1900.

Uses

The fruits – about the size of a chicken egg – are edible, providing a rich source of vitamin C and dietary fiber.

References

chinensis
Flora of China
Fruits originating in East Asia
Plants used in traditional Chinese medicine
Garden plants of Asia
Dioecious plants